Siegfried Kasche (18 June 1903 – 7 June 1947) was an ambassador of the German Reich to the Independent State of Croatia and Obergruppenführer of the Sturmabteilung (SA), a paramilitary wing of the Nazi Party. Kasche was the proposed ruler of the Reichskommissariat Moskowien, but the Reichskommissariat failed to materialize. He was hanged for war crimes in Yugoslavia on 7 June 1947.

Early life
Kasche was born in Strausberg. After attending cadet school in Potsdam and the Lichterfelde military academy, he spent 1919-20 in the Freikorps in Berlin and the Baltic states. He joined the Sturmabteilung in 1925 and the Nazi Party in 1926. He was also a leader of the SA in Pommerania. From 1928-31, Kasche was deputy Gauleiter in Ostmark, and in September 1930 was elected to the Reichstag. In 1934, Kasche was promoted to SA-Obergruppenführer, a rank equal to a lieutenant general in the Wehrmacht. Kasche was one of the few SA general officers to survive the Night of the Long Knives. Kasche survived by pleading his case with Göring until he arranged for Kasche to be left unharmed.

Ambassador to Croatia
In April 1941, Kasche was assigned to the Foreign Ministry for diplomatic service. On 15 April 1941, when Germany recognized the Independent State of Croatia, Kasche was named ambassador. He arrived in Zagreb on 20 April. At a meeting of the Nazi leadership on 16 July he was designated as the future Reichskommissar of the planned Nazi colony called Moskau, which was to comprise the main territories of central and northern Russia up to the Ural Mountains. Military realities on the Eastern Front during the 1941–42 winter prevented its establishment, leaving the project in the planning stages.

In the Independent State of Croatia, Kasche advocated a joint effort of the Axis forces against the Yugoslav Partisans. Since he was very affectionate to Ante Pavelić and "Ustaše revolution", he justified the policy and actions of Ustaše and Hitler called him a "greater Croat than Pavelić". Kasche was in constant conflict with Edmund Glaise-Horstenau, a Plenipotentiary General in the Independent State of Croatia. After the unsuccessful Lorković–Vokić plot in 1944, an attempt to align the Independent State of Croatia to the Allies, Kasche finally found a chance to denigrate Horstenau and make him withdraw from Croatia, as he was involved in the plot.

War crimes
During World War II, many Serbs were deported from Croatia — some to Serbia and others to Germany. The order to deport Serbs did not originate with the leaders of the Independent State of Croatia, which preferred to forcibly convert, kill, or detain as slave labor those Serbs within its boundaries. According to the Nuremberg Tribunal, a conference was held in the German Legation presided over by Siegfried Kasche, "at which it was decided forcibly to evacuate the Slovenes to Croatia and Serbia and the Serbs from Croatia into Serbia. This decision results from a telegram from the Ministry of Foreign Affairs, Number 389, dated 31 May 1941". He reported to Berlin on 18 April 1944 that "Croatia is one of the countries in which the Jewish problem has been solved".

Post-war
After the war in Europe ended, Kasche was returned to Yugoslavia by the Allies. He was tried by the Supreme Court of the People's Republic of Croatia in May 1947, convicted, and executed by hanging on 7 June 1947.

References
Citations

Bibliography

Further reading

 Ernst Klee: Das Personenlexikon zum Dritten Reich. (The Encyclopedia of People of the Third Reich) Revised edition, Frankfurt am Main, 2003, p 299

External links
 

1903 births
1947 deaths
People from Strausberg
People from the Province of Brandenburg
Anti-Serbian sentiment
German Protestants
Nazi Party politicians
Members of the Reichstag of the Weimar Republic
Members of the Reichstag of Nazi Germany
20th-century Freikorps personnel
Nazi Party officials
Executed people from Brandenburg
Sturmabteilung officers
Genocide of Serbs in the Independent State of Croatia perpetrators
Nazis convicted of war crimes
Nazis executed by Yugoslavia by hanging